In graph theory, a complete coloring is a vertex coloring in which every pair of colors appears on at least one pair of adjacent vertices. Equivalently, a complete coloring is minimal in the sense that it cannot be transformed into a proper coloring with fewer colors by merging pairs of color classes.

A complete coloring is the opposite of a harmonious coloring, which requires every pair of colors to appear on at most one pair of adjacent vertices.

Complexity theory
Finding  is an optimization problem. The decision problem for complete coloring can be phrased as:

INSTANCE: a graph  and positive integer 

Determining the achromatic number is NP-hard; determining if it is greater than a given number is NP-complete, as shown by Yannakakis and Gavril in 1978 by transformation from the minimum maximal matching problem.

Note that any coloring of a graph with the minimum number of colors must be a complete coloring, so minimizing the number of colors in a complete coloring is just a restatement of the standard graph coloring problem.

Algorithms
For any fixed k, it is possible to determine whether the achromatic number of a given graph is at least k, in linear time.

The optimization problem permits approximation and is approximable within a  approximation ratio.

Special classes of graphs
The NP-completeness of the achromatic number problem holds also for some special classes of graphs:
bipartite graphs,
complements of bipartite graphs (that is, graphs having no independent set of more than two vertices), cographs and interval graphs, and even for trees.

For complements of trees, the achromatic number can be computed in polynomial time. For trees, it can be approximated to within a constant factor.

References

External links
 A compendium of NP optimization problems
 A Bibliography of Harmonious Colourings and Achromatic Number by Keith Edwards

Graph coloring